was a retainer for the Oda clan.
He was thus treated as Nobunaga's most important retainer and would come to fight in every important battle under Nobunaga's command such as the 1567 Siege of Inabayama Castle, the 1571 and 1573 Siege of Nagashima.

Early life
Born in what is now Minami-ku, Nagoya (situated in contemporary Aichi District, Owari Province) and serving under Oda Nobuhide, Sakuma was entrusted with the care of the young Oda Nobunaga. Although he briefly supported Oda Nobuyuki in his abortive attempts at rebellion in 1557.

Unlike other retainers whose support Oda Nobunaga as clan leader, Sakuma remained steadfastly loyal to Nobunaga, and fought for him consistently.
Sakuma was called Noki Sakuma (退き佐久間), which literally means "retreating Sakuma,"  because of his cautious tactics.

Military life
In 1554, Nobumori took part in the Battle of Kiyosu Castle against Oda Nobutomo, uncle of  Nobunaga.

In 1555, Nobumori took part in the Battle of Ino against Oda Nobuyuki, younger brother of Nobunaga.

In 1560, he is one of Nobunaga main force at the Battle of Okehazama against Imagawa Yoshimoto.

In 1567, he fought in the Siege of Inabayama Castle against Saito Tatsuoki from Saitō clan where he was in the reserve division.

In 1570, He was successful attacking Mitsukuri castle in the campaign against the Rokkaku clan and helped to suppress rebellions caused by Buddhist sects in Echizen Province.

In 1571, Nobumori fought against Ikkō-ikki rebellion in Sieges of Nagashima. He also set fire and burn down Enryakuji at Siege of Mount Hiei. Nobumori was given Kurita County, Omi Province as chigyo-chi (household territory) in November, 1571.

In 1572, he and Takigawa Kazumasu led 3,000-man unit formed part of the reinforcements dispatched by Nobunaga to aid Tokugawa Ieyasu's approximately 8,000 soldiers against the 30,000 led by Takeda Shingen in the Battle of Mikatagahara, Sakuma retreated after a preliminary engagement. His fellow commander Hirate Hirohide, however, who fought alongside the Tokugawa troops, lost his life, and the conflict ended with a crushing defeat of the Tokugawa-Oda alliance.

In 1575, he participated in the Battle of Nagashino against the Takeda clan.

In 1576, after Harada Naomasa's death during the campaign against the heavily fortified and well-supplied Honganji temple in Osaka, Sakuma was chosen as Harada's replacement as commander of the  Siege of Ishiyama Hongan-ji and given troops from seven provinces placing him in command of the largest Oda-clan army among the Oda retainers. However, unlike his colleagues Akechi Mitsuhide, Shibata Katsuie or Hashiba Hideyoshi who all won battles on the fronts to which they were assigned, Nobumori made no progress against the fearless Buddhist zealots.

In 1580, after ten years of warring, Nobunaga had the emperor mediate a truce to end the war. 
That same year, Nobunaga drafted a document containing a nineteen-point accusation against Sakuma's, including past failures with those against the Honganji. Nobunaga banished Sakuma and his son Sakuma Nobuhide to the temple on Mount Koyasan, where they were forced to spend their days in the monk lifestyle.

The man who came to lead the largest force in the Kinki area (Kansai) after Nobumori was Akechi Mitsuhide, and along with the severe human affairs which brought unrest to the vassals, this banishment was often said to be linked to Nobunaga death at the Honnoji Incident.

Death
Nobumori's banishment has widely been regarded as representative of Nobunaga's cold-blooded treatment against even his longest-serving retainers underscoring the clan leader's shortcomings as a military commander.

Nobumori, however, had reportedly held frequent tea parties and seemed more interested in these rather than focusing on military affairs. He never devised, after all, any overarching military measures against the Honganji, even though their war had remained in a stalemate. It has also been recorded that since childhood, Nobumori had been openly critical of Nobunaga. Sakuma died in 1582 at Totsugawa in Yamato Province. He was posthumously named Doumu Keigan (洞無桂巌) and Souyu (宗佑).

Family
Sakuma Nobuhide (:Ja:佐久間信栄): Son

References

1528 births
1582 deaths
Samurai
Oda retainers